, known in sumo and professional wrestling as  or simply by his shikona  ("Riser from Toyo"), was a sumo wrestler from Japan.
After retiring as a rikishi from sumo, he became a professional wrestler.

Career

In professional wrestling
On December 12, 1954, Toyonobori became a professional wrestler, joining the Japanese Wrestling Association, which was the top wrestling promotion in Japan from 1953 until 1972 and the only male significant Japanese wrestling promotion from 1953 until 1966, when its predominance began to be challenged by International Pro Wrestling.

The top wrestler of the JWA was Rikidozan, the founder of the promotion; he dominated the Japanese wrestling scene. As a result, few Japanese wrestlers were able to get into the spotlight.
The more recognizable among them was Toyonobori himself, who dominated the tag team scene in Japan, forming a successful tag team with Rikidozan, with whom he became a four-time winner of the All Asia Tag Team Championship, which was the top tag title in Japan and which is now contested in All Japan Pro Wrestling.

After Rikidozan's death on December 15, 1963, Toyonobori, along with Yoshinosato, Koukichi Endo and Michiaki Yoshimura announced their intention to continue the JWA on January 10, 1964. Therefore, he became the president of the JWA and its top wrestler, as he had been the second most important wrestler of the promotion during the Rikidozan era.

He formed two successful tag teams with Michiaki Yoshimura and then Giant Baba, with whom he won the All Asia Tag Team Championship three more times. Yoshimura and Baba were among the young wrestlers the JWA was trying to push to the top, so they were paired with the top wrestler of the JWA, a strategy the promotion followed before pairing Toyonobori himself with the popular Rikidozan.

On December 12, 1964, Toyonobori won the World Heavyweight Championship of Worldwide Wrestling Associates from The Destroyer at the Tokyo Gym; the title was universally recognized as a world title back then and had been held by Rikidozan himself (it has been the first world title to be held by an Asian wrestler). Toyonobori was therefore the first Japanese wrestler to win a world title in Professional Wrestling as Rikidozan was Korean (although the true ethnicity of Rikidozan emerged only long after his death). WWA did not recognise the title change, while the JWA recognized it. Because of this, there were two WWA world heavyweight champions, defending their titles respectively in Japan and in the United States of America.

On September 20, 1965 Toyonobori was defeated by disqualification by Luke Graham
at the Los Angeles Olympic Auditorium to end the dispute over the WWA World Heavyweight title.

Toyonobori began losing power in the JWA, which then started pushing Giant Baba to the top of the promotion, leading him to win its top single title, the NWA International Heavyweight Championship (which had been held up after Rikidozan's death), in 1965. After Rikidozan's death, the JWA did not have one single title; the Japanese Heavyweight Championship, the All Asia Heavyweight Championship and the NWA International Heavyweight Championship, which were held by Rikidozan himself, were all recognized and only the last two titles were later revived (respectively in 1968 and in 1965).

On January 5, 1966, the JWA announced the resignation and departure of Toyonobori as the company president; he was later expelled from the JWA along with Antonio Inoki on March 21, 1966. On April 23, 1966, Toyonobori announced the formation of Tokyo Pro Wrestling; on the same day Inoki announced his intention to join the company, as Toyonobori has privately promised Inoki to make him the promotion's top star.

On October 12, 1966, Tokyo Pro had its first card at the Sumo Hall with Inoki in the main event. However, on April 6, 1967, the JWA announced the return of Antonio Inoki to the promotion.
Therefore, Tokyo Pro folded, having lost its top star. Along with most of the former Tokyo Pro wrestlers, Toyonobori joined International Wrestling Enterprise, which had been founded in the meantime on October 21, 1966 by Isao Yoshiwara and Hiro Matsuda and which had its first card in Osaka on January 5, 1967 in conjunction with Tokyo Pro. IWE then started surpassing the dominance of the JWA in Japanese wrestling.

On December 19, 1968, Toyonobori was defeated by Billy Robinson in a round-robin tournament to become the first IWA World Heavyweight Champion, the first Japanese-based world heavyweight championship in professional wrestling history.

On May 18, 1969, Toyonobori and Shozo Kobayashi, nicknamed Strong Kobayashi, defeated Michael Nador and Ivan Strogoff in Paris, France to become the first IWA World Tag Team Champions.

On February 11, 1970 Toyonobori announced his retirement at an IWE event. However, in March 1972, when Inoki left JWA to form New Japan Pro-Wrestling, Toyonobori came out of retirement for a few matches to help give the promotion name value. His last match was on February 20, 1973, a win over Bruno Bekkar in Yokohama, more than three years after his original retirement ceremony.

Toyonobori died on July 1, 1998 due to heart failure.

Championships and accomplishments
Japanese Wrestling Association
All Asia Tag Team Championship (7 times) - with Rikidozan (4), Michiaki Yoshimura (1) and  Giant Baba (2)
JWA World Tag Team Championship (1 time) - with Rikidozan
World Big League (1964, 1965)
International Wrestling Enterprise
TWWA World Tag Team Championship (1 time) - with Koji Thunder Sugiyama
IWA World Tag Team Championship (1 time) - with Shozo Strong Kobayashi
Worldwide Wrestling Associates
WWA World Heavyweight Championship (1 time) (recognized by Japanese Wrestling Association, disputed by WWA)

Awards
Tokyo Sports Newspaper
Achievement Award (1998)

Sumo career record
Only two tournaments were held through most of the 1940s.

See also
List of sumo tournament second division champions
Glossary of sumo terms
List of past sumo wrestlers

References

External links
facts about Toyonobori career during Rikidozan era
facts about Toyonobori career after Rikidozan era

Japanese male professional wrestlers
Professional wrestling executives
Japanese sumo wrestlers
Sumo people from Fukuoka Prefecture
1931 births
1998 deaths
All Asia Tag Team Champions